The Four Falls Border Crossing is a one-way crossing between Fort Fairfield, Maine and Four Falls, New Brunswick on the Canada–US border. Traffic is seasonally permitted to enter Canada at this location, but people entering the United States face arrest per immigration and customs laws.

History
This crossing opened in 1934, and traffic was permitted in both directions.  In the late 1950s, the US closed its border station; however Canada continued to operate its border station until April 1, 1985.  Both border stations were demolished after their respective closures. In 1994, the Government of Canada relented to pressure from members of the nearby Aroostook Valley Country Club to reopen the crossing during golf season.  The US government refused to reopen its border station, but it allowed vehicles to enter as long as they proceeded only as far as the golf course, or if they traveled directly to an open US border inspection station to report for inspection.

After the September 11 attacks, the United States changed its entry policies, requiring all travelers to enter at an open border inspection station.  This meant that Canadian golfers could not enter the US via Brown Road,  and even Canadian residents who can only access their homes via Russell Road could not legally drive to their homes from Canada.

See also
 List of Canada–United States border crossings
 Aroostook Valley Country Club

External links
 Aroostook Valley Country Club

References

Canada–United States border crossings
Transportation buildings and structures in Aroostook County, Maine
1934 establishments in Maine
1934 establishments in New Brunswick